Patch Media, also known as Patch.com, is an American local news and information platform, based in Manhattan. It is primarily owned by Hale Global. As of January 2022, Patch's more than 100 journalists operated approximately 1,259 hyperlocal news websites, which also have an information component, in 50 U.S. states and Washington, D.C. Patch is operated by Patch Media Corporation.

Patch is first, a local news website. Patch.com sites contain news and human interest stories reported locally. It does not offer international news. Patch also provides a platform for users to post questions, news tips and columns germane to their towns. Each site also contains a mixture of local and national advertising. The latter includes a self-serve ad platform allowing users to communicate directly with targeted audiences.

History 
Patch was founded by then-president of Google Americas operations Tim Armstrong, Warren Webster and Jon Brod in 2007 after Armstrong said he found a dearth of online information on his home-neighborhood of Riverside, Connecticut. AOL acquired the company in 2009 shortly after Armstrong became AOL's CEO. Armstrong told AOL staffers that he recused himself from negotiations to acquire the company and did not directly profit from his seed investment.

The acquisition occurred on June 11, 2009. AOL paid an estimated $7 million in cash for the news platform as part of its effort to reinvent itself as a content provider beyond its legacy dial-up Internet business. AOL, which split from Time Warner in late 2009, announced in 2010 it would be investing $50 million or more into the startup of the Patch.com network. As part of the acquisition Brod became President of AOL Ventures, Local & Mapping, and Warren Webster became president of Patch.

Following the acquisition, Patch began a period of rapid expansion, becoming one of the largest employers of professional journalists in the US at the time. The company grew from 46 markets to over 400 in 2010. The New York Times wrote in 2011, "AOL's Patch: Finding Progress Where Others Have Failed." In 2011, Patch acquired hyperlocal news aggregator Outside.in from investors including Union Square Ventures and others, integrating the technology into the Patch platform.

In 2013, Patch was spun out of AOL as a joint venture with Hale Global. In January 2014, the new owners announced layoffs of 400 journalists and other employees.

In February 2016, The Wall Street Journal reported that Patch had 23 million users, was profitable and expanding into new territories. In 2018, Patch completed its third profitable year in a row, attracting an average of 23.5 million unique visitors monthly. Patch employs nearly 150 people, including 110 full-time reporters, many from the nation's leading newsrooms.

Alison Bernstein was named CEO in September 2019, and later transitioned to the company's board. Rob Cain, formerly of Omron Adept, became Patch's CEO in November 2020. Charles Hale informed Recode in 2019 that his network of 1,200-plus hyperlocal news sites was generating more than $20 million in annual ad revenue, without a paywall.

References

External links
 Official website
 

Internet properties established in 2007
Local mass media in the United States
AOL
Mass media in California
Mass media in Connecticut
Mass media in Washington, D.C.
Mass media in Florida
Mass media in Georgia (U.S. state)
Mass media in Illinois
Mass media in Iowa
Mass media in Maine
Mass media in Maryland
Mass media in Massachusetts
Mass media in Michigan
Mass media in Minnesota
Mass media in Missouri
Mass media in North Carolina
Mass media in New Hampshire
Mass media in New Jersey
Mass media in New York (state)
Mass media in Ohio
Mass media in Oregon
Mass media in Pennsylvania
Mass media in Rhode Island
Mass media in South Carolina
Mass media in Texas
Mass media in Virginia
Mass media in Washington (state)
Mass media in Wisconsin